Zephyr in an unincorporated community in western Surry County, North Carolina, United States in Bryan Township.  The community is centered on the intersection of Zephyr-Mountain Park Road and Poplar Springs Road/Zephyr Road (SR 1001) and lies between the Mitchell River and Little Creek .  Prominent landmarks in the center of the community include Gum Orchard Baptist Church and the Zephyr Cemetery.

References

Unincorporated communities in Surry County, North Carolina
Unincorporated communities in North Carolina